Spreadeagle, spread eagle, spread-eagle, or Spread Eagle may refer to:

 Spread Eagle (album), a Peter Pan Speedrock album
 Spread Eagle (band), an American hard rock band
 Spread eagle (figure skating)
 Spreadeagle (heraldry), a figure derived from a heraldic depiction of an eagle
 Spread Eagle (horse), an 18th-century Thoroughbred racehorse
 Spreadeagle (position), a position with limbs spread well apart
 Spread Eagle (steamboat), a steamboat that operated on the Missouri River in the 19th century 
 Blood eagle or spread-eagle, an alleged Viking method of execution
 A split in candlepin bowling

Places
 Spread Eagle, Camden, London, England
 Spread Eagle, Wisconsin, U.S.
 Spread Eagle, a community in Newfoundland and Labrador
 Spread Eagle, Wandsworth, a pub in London

See also
 Spread-eagleism, the 19th century precursor to the term "Jingoism"
 The Spread of the Eagle, a 1963 BBC television series